5-MeO-MET (5-Methoxy-N-methyl-N-ethyltryptamine) is a relatively rare designer drug from the substituted tryptamine family, related to compounds such as N-methyl-N-ethyltryptamine and 5-MeO-DMT. It was first synthesised in the 1960s and was studied to a limited extent, but was first identified on the illicit market in June 2012 in Sweden. It was made illegal in Norway in 2013, and is controlled under analogue provisions in numerous other jurisdictions.

See also 
 4-HO-MET
 5-HO-DiPT
 5-EtO-DMT
 5-Fluoro-MET
 5-MeO-EPT
 5-MeO-MALT
 5-MeO-MiPT
 7F-5-MeO-MET

References 

Tryptamines
Methoxy compounds
Substances discovered in the 1960s